Dave Newman (28 February 1923 – 4 February 1995) was an Australian rules footballer who played with Collingwood and Melbourne in the Victorian Football League (VFL).

Notes

External links 

Profile on Collingwood Forever

1923 births
Australian rules footballers from Victoria (Australia)
Collingwood Football Club players
Melbourne Football Club players
1995 deaths